Agnes Lange (7 August 1929 – 16 February 2021) was a German politician who served in the Bürgerschaft of Bremen.

Biography
Lange was a member of the Social Democratic Party of Germany and served in various positions within the party. She was a member of the Bürgerschaft of Bremen from 1984 to 1991 and was very active in business, foreign trade, construction, and urban development.

Agnes Lange died in Bremen on 16 February 2021 at the age of 91.

References

1929 births
2021 deaths
Members of the Bürgerschaft of Bremen
Politicians from Bremen
20th-century German politicians